Hard Copy is an American tabloid television show that ran in syndication from 1989 to 1999. Hard Copy was aggressive in its use of questionable material on television, including gratuitous violence.

The original hosts of Hard Copy were Alan Frio and Terry Murphy. Frio left the series after the 1990–91 season and was succeeded by Barry Nolan in the fall of 1991. Nolan and Murphy would stay until after the 1997–98 season, when they both departed. In the show's final season, Kyle Kraska took over as the sole host.

Hard Copy was produced and distributed by Paramount Domestic Television and, for much of its time on air, was often aired with its sister show,  the Hollywood news program Entertainment Tonight as part of an hour-long programming block sold to local stations.

Overview
Hard Copy was a tabloid show that aired footage and news about celebrities and everyday people.  Also featured were interviews with various newsmakers.

1992 Elton John lawsuit
In 1992, Elton John threatened to take Hard Copy to court, alleging a reporter tried to blackmail him into giving an interview by falsely claiming he had HIV/AIDS and had moved to Atlanta to be near an AIDS treatment center. John alleged extortion, defamation, right to privacy and endangerment.

The day after the lawsuit was filed, the show ran a segment about John but, rather than accuse him of having HIV, praised him for the work he was doing for those affected by the disease. John's attorney at law told National Enquirer he "assume(d) the show was changed as a result of our suit".

1994 Simpsons episode
On November 27, 1994, FOX aired an episode of The Simpsons entitled "Homer Badman".  When Homer takes babysitter Ashley Grant home from babysitting their kids, he is assumed to commit sexual harassment though in reality he is trying to eat a rare piece of Gummy candy.  The entire incident devolves into a media frenzy complete with a standoff. To make matters worse, Dennis Franz voiced himself playing Homer in a TV movie.

As a result, Homer takes part in a Hard Copy-like show called Rock Bottom.  However, the show distorts Homer's case and it takes public-access television and aid from Groundskeeper Willie, who was filming in the area at the time of the incident, to clear Homer's name.  The episode ended with Rock Bottom giving a series of corrections.

1996 celebrity boycott
In 1996, actor George Clooney began a public boycott of both Hard Copy and Paramount's celebrity news show Entertainment Tonight after Hard Copy violated a six-month agreement not to air segments about Clooney by airing footage of Clooney and then-girlfriend Celine Balitran on the set of the film Batman & Robin. Other celebrities supporting the boycott including Whoopi Goldberg, Madonna, and Steven Spielberg. Paramount eventually agreed to modify the way that both shows gathered information for their stories. They also agreed not to air "unauthorized footage" of celebrities or "footage that is known to have been obtained illegally."

Hosts
 Alan Frio: Host (1989–1991)
 Terry Murphy: Host (1989–1998)
 Barry Nolan: Host (1991–1998)
 Kyle Kraska: Host (1998–1999)
 Remy Blumenfeld: London Correspondent (1991–1996)
 Jerry Penacoli: Reporter (1996–1999)
 Pat Lalama: Reporter (1996–1999)
 Edward Miller: Reporter (1996–1999)
 Doug Bruckner: Reporter
 Rafael Abramovitz: Correspondent
 Diane Dimond: Reporter
 Sylvia Villagran: Reporter
 Roger Lodge: Reporter

International versions
An Australian version of the series hosted by Gordon Elliott aired in the early 1990s.

A New Zealand version of the series hosted by Natalie Brunt (now Natalie Chetkovich) and, later, Pip Groves aired in the mid 1990s.

References

External links

1989 American television series debuts
1980s American television news shows
1999 American television series endings
1990s American television news shows
English-language television shows
Entertainment news shows in the United States
First-run syndicated television programs in the United States
Television series by CBS Studios